Elliston can refer to:

Places
Elliston, Indiana, U.S.
Elliston, Montana, U.S.
Elliston, Newfoundland and Labrador, Canada
Elliston Ridge Air Station, radar station in Newfoundland and Labrador, Canada
Elliston, South Australia
District Council of Elliston
Elliston, Virginia, U.S.
Elliston-Lafayette, Virginia, U.S.
Joseph Elliston House, a ca. 1817 house in Brentwood, Tennessee, U.S.
Lands of Elliston, Parish of Lochwinnoch in Scotland

Given name
Elliston Campbell (1891–1990), Australian electrical engineer and philanthropist

Surname
George Elliston (1883–1946), American journalist
George Sampson Elliston (1875–1954), British military officer and politician
Grace Elliston (died 1950), American theatre actress
Henry Twiselton Elliston (1801–1864), English musical composer and inventor
Jesse Elliston (died 1853), proprietor of Elliston & Cavell, a former department store in Oxford, England
Joseph Thorpe Elliston (1779 -1856), American silversmith, planter and politician
Robert William Elliston (1774–1831), English actor
Sydney Robert Elliston (1870-1943) English priest